Marriage in Heaven is a 1938 novel by the Romanian writer Mircea Eliade. It consists of the correspondence between two unhappy men: one whose lover wanted children while he did not, and one who was abandoned by a woman who did not want children while he did. The plot has autobiographical elements from Eliade's relationship with his wife Nina.

An English translation by M. L. Ricketts exists but has not been published. The Italian translation received the 1984 Elba-Brignetti Prize for best foreign book.

Bibliography

References

1938 novels
Romanian novels
Works by Mircea Eliade